Oskar van Hattum (born 14 April 2002) is a New Zealand professional footballer who plays as a forward for Wellington Phoenix.

Club career

Youth career
Van Hattum played football for Francis Douglas Memorial College in New Plymouth, and played representative football for Taranaki and Central Football with whom he won the golden boot at the under-14 national age group tournament in 2016.
In 2017, van Hattum moved to Wellington to join the Wellington Phoenix Academy.

Senior career
In December 2021, van Hattum was among three academy players called up to join the Wellington Phoenix A-League squad in Australia ahead of a busy schedule and was named amongst the substitutes for the A-League game against Western Sydney Wanderers later that week. He made his professional debut on 7 December 2021 in a FFA Cup match against A-League Men side Western United FC.

Van Hattum made his A-League debut on the 19 December 2021, in a 2–1 loss against Sydney FC.

International career

Van Hattum was named in the New Zealand U-17 side for the 2018 OFC U-16 Championship in Honiara, appearing in all 5 matches and scoring 4 goals including the first penalty of the final as New Zealand won the tournament, beating hosts Solomon Islands on penalties in the final. Both finalists earned the right to represent Oceania at the 2019 FIFA U-17 World Cup in Brazil.

Van Hattum played all three games in the group stage at the finals in Brazil as New Zealand finished third in their group.

Family
Van Hattum is the son of a New Zealand born father of Dutch decent and an Australian born mother of Austrian decent. He is the nephew of notable former New Zealand goalkeeper Frank van Hattum and former New Zealand women internationals Grazia MacIntosh and Marie-Jose Cooper.

References

External links

Living people
New Zealand association footballers
Association football forwards
Wellington Phoenix FC players
2002 births
People educated at Francis Douglas Memorial College
People educated at Scots College, Wellington
New Zealand people of Dutch descent
New Zealand people of Austrian descent
New Zealand people of Australian descent
Sportspeople from New Plymouth
New Zealand National League players